Keaton Isaksson (born 21 April 1994) is a Finnish professional footballer who plays as a midfielder.

Career
He signed for SJK for the 2020 season. He left the club on 13 November 2020, moving to HIFK in February 2021. On 8 April 2022, Isaksson returned to HIFK for the 2022 season. On 17 July 2022 HIFK announced that his contract expired and will not be renewed.

References

1994 births
Living people
Finnish footballers
Pallokerho Keski-Uusimaa players
FC Viikingit players
FC Viikkarit players
IF Gnistan players
HIFK Fotboll players
Ekenäs IF players
IFK Luleå players
Kemi City F.C. players
IFK Mariehamn players
Seinäjoen Jalkapallokerho players
Veikkausliiga players
Ykkönen players
Kakkonen players
Ettan Fotboll players
Association football midfielders
Finnish expatriate footballers
Finnish expatriate sportspeople in Sweden
Expatriate footballers in Sweden